Allahu Akbar is a 1977 Indian Malayalam-language film,  directed by Moidu Padiyath. The film stars Jayabharathi, Jeassy and Calif in the lead roles. The film has musical score by M. S. Baburaj.

Cast 
Jayabharathi
Jeassy
Vincent
K. P. Ummer

Soundtrack 
The music was composed by M. S. Baburaj and the lyrics were written by P. Bhaskaran.

References

External links 
 

1977 films
1970s Malayalam-language films